Flavon is a frazione of the comune (municipality) of Contà in Trentino in the northern Italian region Trentino-Alto Adige/Südtirol, located about  north of Trento. It was an independent commune until 1 January 2016.

References 

Frazioni of Trentino-Alto Adige/Südtirol